Hapkido, released as Lady Kung Fu in North America, is a 1972 Hong Kong martial arts film directed by Huang Feng and starring Angela Mao. The film co-stars Carter Wong and Sammo Hung, and has early cameo appearances from Jackie Chan, Yuen Biao and Corey Yuen. It was released by Golden Harvest.

Plot
It is 1934, in Japanese occupied Korea. Yu Ying, Kao Chang and Fan Wei are sitting and talking in a park when they are approached by a group of Japanese toughs. The leader of the Japanese begins to make unwelcome advances, and Yu Ying tries her best to ignore him. Fan Wei loses his temper and a melee ensues. These three have just graduated, learning the art of Hapkido and they return to China in the hopes of setting up their own school, which they do. The Japanese, who consider it an inferior martial art, try to run them out of town with some traitorous Chinese, including Chou Ba-tien. Yu Ying, Kao Chang and Fan Wei do not want any trouble as it goes against the wishes of their master and his teachings. It is Fan Wei who finally loses it after being insulted by some Japanese. This does not go down well and Fan Wei becomes a wanted man, having to hide out while Yu Ying and Kao Chang try to reason with The Black Bear Gang without much luck. Finally the Japanese go too far, killing both Kao Chang and Fan Wei, which forces Yu Ying to fight back along with her Hapkido Elder Brother, killing the leaders of the Black Bear Gang.

Cast
Angela Mao as Yu Ying
Carter Wong as Kao Chang
Sammo Hung as Fan Wei
Wong In Sik as Elder classmate
Ji Han Jae as Teacher Shih Kung-chan
Pai Ying as Chou Ba-tien
Nancy Sit as Hsiao Hsiu
Goro Kumon as Toyoda Yaguma (Nihongo: やぐま豊田, Yaguma Toyota)
Ping-Ao Wei as Chang Pu-tse
Lan Sun as Sung Chung
Di Chin as Hsiao Lao-fu
Wei Yang as Traitor
Leung Siu-lung as Hu Chia
Ka Ting Lee as Chief disciple

Cameos/Extras
Hsu Hsia as Black Bear Student with a sword
Billy Chan as Marketplace fighter
Ching-Ying Lam as Marketplace fighter
Ching Siu-tung as Black Bear Student
Alan Chui Chung-San as Black Bear/Hapkido student
Jackie Chan as Black Bear/Hapkido student
Yuen Wah as Black Bear/Hapkido Student
Yuen Biao as Black Bear student
Corey Yuen as Hapkido student
Peter Chan as Hapkido student

Reception

In September 1973, the film topped the North American box office, briefly overtaking the Bruce Lee blockbuster Enter the Dragon, which eventually regained the top spot several weeks later. It was digitally re-mastered and restored by Hong Kong Legends in 2006.

References

External links

1972 films
1970s martial arts films
Hong Kong martial arts films
1970s Cantonese-language films
Girls with guns films
Kung fu films
Hapkido films
Films set in Korea under Japanese rule
Second Sino-Japanese War films
Japan in non-Japanese culture
1970s Hong Kong films